Keyingham is a village and civil parish in the East Riding of Yorkshire, England.

History

Keyingham is listed in the 1086 Domesday Book as in the Hundred of Holderness, with 31 households, 30 villagers, one priest and a church. In 1066 Thorfridh held the lordship, this transferred by 1086 to Drogo of la BeuvriËre, who was also Tenant-in-chief to King William I.

In 1823 Keyingham (or Kyingham) was a civil parish in the Wapentake and Liberty of Holderness. The patronage of the ecclesiastical parish and church was under the Archbishop of York. In 1802 the interest from a bequest of 200 shillings was left for the education of poor parish children of 'Kayingham', administered by the churchwardens, and the incumbent who held his post as a perpetual curate. Parish population in 1823 was 639. Occupations included eight farmers, two blacksmiths, two wheelwrights, four grocers, a corn miller, six shoemakers, two tailors, one of whom was also a draper, a bricklayer who was also the parish clerk, a school master, the landlord of The Blue Bell and the landlady of The Gate public houses. Two carriers operated between the village and Hull twice weekly.

Keyingham was served from 1854 to 1964 by Keyingham railway station on the Hull and Holderness Railway.

Community

According to the 2011 UK Census, Keyingham parish had a population of 2,314, an increase on the 2001 UK Census figure of 2,302.

The parish church of St Nicholas is a Grade I listed building. Its spire was removed and parapets rebuilt in the late 1960s. Within St Nicholas' Church south chapel was a shrine to Philip Ingleberd (died ). The remains of the medieval ashlar St Philip's Cross, Grade II listed and dedicated to Ingleberd, stands on Church Lane. Further parish listed structures are a farmhouse,  to the south at Little Dam Lane, The Old Vicarage on Station Road, and two windmill towers, one on Mill Road, the other on Ottringham Road.

Keyingham amenities and businesses include a doctor's surgery, a Co-operative food store, a newsagent, a butchers, takeaway outlets, a funeral directors, hairdressers, and a village hall. The village public house is the Ship Inn on Main Street. A further public house and a former coaching inn on Main Street, the Blue Bell, closed in 2012 now re-opened. Two horticultural nurseries which cover an area almost equal to that of the village are at the east and west of the village. To the west are sand and gravel pits. Highland cattle are kept in a field just outside the village.

Education
The village has one primary school, Keyingham Primary School. It was opened to pupils at the beginning of the 2007 school year, replacing the former infant school on the same site. The new school combines the former junior and infant schools, the junior school being based in a former board school building across the road which closed in 2006.

References

External links

 Keyingham Primary School
 Keyingham Weather

 

Villages in the East Riding of Yorkshire
Holderness
Civil parishes in the East Riding of Yorkshire